Edward of Cnoll was the Dean of Wells during 1264.

References

Deans of Wells